Chiromachla leuconoe is a moth of the  family Erebidae. It is found in the Democratic Republic of Congo, Ethiopia, Kenya, Malawi, Mozambique, South Africa, Sudan, Tanzania, Uganda and Zambia.

Subspecies
Chiromachla leuconoe leuconoe
Chiromachla leuconoe limbalis (Strand, 1909) (Tanzania, Uganda)

References

Nyctemerina
Moths described in 1857
Moths of Sub-Saharan Africa